Babel is a public radio station in Uruguay, broadcasting a world and instrumental music format. It is one of the four services of Radiodifusión Nacional del Uruguay and broadcasts on 97.1 FM in Montevideo and 100.9 FM in Maldonado. In addition to the two full-time stations, RNU's regional repeaters air Babel overnight from 12 to 6 a.m.

External links

Radio in Uruguay
Mass media in Montevideo
Radiodifusión Nacional del Uruguay